Black Snakes is a collaboration between the experimental rock band Red Krayola and the conceptual art group Art & Language. It was released in 1983 by RecRec Music. The album was adopted by Drag City and re-issued on CD in 1997.

Critical reception
Dave Thompson, in Alternative Rock, referred to the album as an "avant-garde theater [soundtrack] without the theater to explain what was happening."

Track listing

Personnel 

Musicians
Ben Annesley – bass guitar
Chris Taylor – drums
Allen Ravenstine – synthesizer, saxophone
Mayo Thompson – guitar, vocals

Production
Etienne Conod – recording
Eric Radcliffe – mixing
Robert Vogel – recording

References

External links 
 

1983 albums
Drag City (record label) albums
RecRec Music albums
Red Krayola albums